The 2004 NCAA Division I Indoor Track and Field Championships were contested to determine the individual and team national champions of men's and women's NCAA collegiate indoor track and field events in the United States after the 2003–04 season, the 40th annual meet for men and 22nd annual meet for women.

For the fifth consecutive year, the championships were held at the Randal Tyson Track Center at the University of Arkansas in Fayetteville, Arkansas.

LSU won the men's title, the Tigers' second and first since 2001.

LSU also won the women's title, the Lady Tigers' eleventh and third consecutive.

Qualification
All teams and athletes from Division I indoor track and field programs were eligible to compete for this year's individual and team titles.

Team standings 
 Note: Top 10 only
 Scoring: 6 points for a 1st-place finish in an event, 4 points for 2nd, 3 points for 3rd, 2 points for 4th, and 1 point for 5th
 (DC) = Defending Champions
 † = Participation vacated by NCAA Committee on Infractions

Men's title
 68 teams scored at least one point

Women's title
 55 teams scored at least one point

See also
2003 NCAA Division I Cross Country Championships
2004 NCAA Division I Outdoor Track and Field Championships

References

NCAA Indoor Track and Field Championships
Ncaa Indoor Track And Field Championships
Ncaa Indoor Track And Field Championships